Lahta, or Zayein, is a Karenic language of Burma.

Distribution
Lahta is spoken in:
Shan State: Pekhon (Phaikum) and Pinlaung townships
Mandalay Region: Pyinmana township

Zayein is spoken in between Mobye and Phekon towns in southern Shan State. Zayein may be a dialect of Lahta.

References

Sources
Ywar, Naw Hsa Eh. 2013. A Grammar of Kayan Lahta. Master’s thesis, Payap University.
Shintani Tadahiko. 2014. The Zayein language. Linguistic survey of Tay cultural area (LSTCA) no. 102. Tokyo: Research Institute for Languages and Cultures of Asia and Africa (ILCAA).

Karenic languages